Ricardo Antonio La Volpe Guarchoni (born 6 February 1952) is an Argentine former professional footballer and manager. He is a World Cup-winning goalkeeper who played for most of his career in Argentina and Mexico.

As a coach, La Volpe was in charge of both the Mexico and Costa Rica national teams, coaching the former at the 2006 World Cup. As club manager at Atlante, the league title was won in the 1992–93 season.

On 22 April 2020, in an interview with David Faitelson, he announced his retirement from management.

Playing career 
In Argentina, La Volpe played for Banfield and San Lorenzo. In Mexico he played for Atlante and Oaxtepec.

La Volpe made eight appearances with Argentina throughout his career. He was the reserve goalkeeper when they won the 1978 FIFA World Cup with Argentina.

Managerial career

Early career 
Ricardo La Volpe began his career as a coach in the Mexican league in 1989, managing several teams such as Oaxtepec, Puebla, Atlante, Guadalajara, Querétaro, América, Atlas, Toluca, and Monterrey. Despite mixed results, La Volpe earned a reputation for his offensive-style of football. He led Atlante to the 1992–1993 season championship and reached the league final with Atlas in 1999.

Mexico national team 
In 2002 La Volpe was named coach of the Mexico national team. He led the team to win the 2003 CONCACAF Gold Cup and qualified for the 2006 World Cup, as well finishing in fourth place at the 2005 Confederations Cup, most notably defeating eventual champions Brazil in the group stage. With La Volpe at the helm, Mexico reached fourth place in the FIFA World rankings.

Also under his leadership at the 2004 Copa América, Mexico managed to defeat Argentina for the first time in years, but lost to Brazil in the quarterfinals. Mexico also lost at the 2005 CONCACAF Gold Cup quarterfinals to Colombia. Mexico was also eliminated at the 2004 Olympic Games after losing to South Korea in the group stage.

At the 2006 FIFA World Cup, Mexico finished second in their group, qualifying to the Round of 16 before going out 1–2 in extra time to Argentina. The Guardian named him Best Coach of the World Cup for his attitude.

Boca Juniors 
After leaving the Mexico national team, he met with Boca Juniors officials on 24 July 2006. After several weeks of negotiation, it was agreed on 22 August that La Volpe would take over as Boca manager on 15 September, replacing Alfio Basile who had been selected to manage the Argentina national team.

La Volpe had a bumpy start with Boca Juniors, including a 3–1 loss against archi-rivals River Plate on 8 October. On 12 October, Boca lost 3–1 to Uruguayan club Nacional on penalty kicks in the Copa Sudamericana, and so were out of the competition. Boca failed three times to claim the Apertura Championship in the final weeks of the season, and then lost a playoff against Estudiantes. Keeping his word that he would quit if he lost, La Volpe resigned after the match.
Later that year he became the new Vélez Sársfield manager, but did not stay in the job long. After watching his team suffer bruising defeats by River Plate and Boca Juniors in the Apertura 2007, and his team in 10th place, he resigned as coach.

Return to Mexico 
In 2008, Ricardo La Volpe returned to Mexico as manager of Monterrey. After several days of speculation, the decision was finally announced in the club's official website, as the replacement of former manager Isaac Mizrahi. He had a bumpy start, and didn't win until his fifth match. Monterrey finished the season in 8th place and had the league's leading goal scorer, Humberto Suazo.  Monterrey's league would end in the semi-finals in which they were eliminated by Santos Laguna after an aggregate score of 3–3 Fans of Monterrey spoke highly of La Volpe for helping the team reach the playoffs again after two dismal seasons of not qualifying including a last place finish during the last tournament. In the Apertura 2008 the team would have a fairly good start, but completely fell apart towards the end of the tournament placing Monterrey in the bottom of the table, hence not qualifying to the playoffs. After the disappointing tournament, the team did not offer the money La Volpe was looking for and he decided to leave the team.

Return to Atlas 
On 28 January 2009, La Volpe signed, once again, with Atlas. Fans of the team had been yearning for him to come back to the squad in which many said he had his most success. The tournament was not successful with the team failing to qualify to the playoffs, finishing 13th. On 18 November the Argentine coach quit Atlas due to poor results, and was replaced by Carlos Ischia.

Costa Rica 
On 9 September 2010, the former Atlas coach became the new manager of Costa Rica, replacing interim coach Rónald González. The Argentine had originally signed until July 2014, however, poor performance during the 2011 Gold Cup and 2011 Copa América, ended his contract prematurely on 11 August 2011.

Guadalajara 

La Volpe was named Guadalajara manager after a 4–0 loss against América with just four games to go in the tournament. After a win against Pachuca on his debut, he finished the league with a draw and 2 losses. However, on 30 April 2014, La Volpe was fired by Vergara after a female staff member alleged improper behavior by La Volpe toward her, resulting in a lawsuit.

América 
Following the sacking of Club América's manager Ignacio Ambríz, La Volpe was announced as manager on 22 September 2016. Just two days after becoming manager, they defeated Universidad Nacional, 2–1. He led América towards a strong final stretch at the end of 2016, culminating with a fourth-place finish at the FIFA Club World Cup and finishing runners-up in the Apertura championship match against Tigres UANL.

Although contributing by debuting major prospects such as Diego Lainez and Edson Álvarez, Lavolpe and America decided to part ways after a lackluster Clausura 2017 where America failed to qualify to the playoffs for the first time since 2011.

Reception

Influence 
La Volpe's philosophy, style of play, and attitude referred to as "Lavolpismo," has played a considerable role in the evolution of tactics and strategy in Mexican league football. Coaches who have studied under and continue to use a modified version of his style of play and philosophy are referred to as "Lavolpistas".
Notable managers directly influenced by La Volpe include Miguel Herrera, José Guadalupe Cruz, Rubén Omar Romano, Hernan Cristante, Jose Saturnino Cardozo and Sergio Bueno.

Criticism 
During Mexico's first group-stage match in the 2006 World Cup against Iran, La Volpe was seen chain-smoking in the dugout, leading to an official warning from FIFA that he was not allowed to smoke in the competition area. La Volpe responded by telling FIFA's executives that he would "rather give up football than smoking", although he later consented.

He has also had clashes with the press. During a press conference at the 2006 World Cup, La Volpe told a journalist: "¡Fuera de mi vista! No saben nada. No me rompan los huevos, idiotas." ["Get out of my face! You know nothing. Don't break my balls, you idiots."]

He has odd superstitions some which include wearing a lucky tie, performing "oriental" rituals and avoiding shaking the opposing manager's hand prior to or after the game.

Honours

Player 
Argentina
FIFA World Cup: 1978

Manager 
Atlante
Primera División de México: 1992–93

Mexico
CONCACAF Gold Cup: 2003

Mexico U23
CONCACAF Olympic Qualifying Championship: 2004

Individual
Primera División de México Manager of the Tournament:1992–93

References

External links 

1952 births
Living people
Footballers from Buenos Aires
Argentine people of Italian descent
Argentine footballers
Argentina international footballers
1978 FIFA World Cup players
FIFA World Cup-winning players
Club Atlético Banfield footballers
San Lorenzo de Almagro footballers
Atlante F.C. footballers
C.F. Oaxtepec footballers
Argentine expatriate footballers
Expatriate footballers in Mexico
Association football goalkeepers
Argentine football managers
Mexican football managers
Club Puebla managers
Atlante F.C. managers
C.D. Guadalajara managers
Club América managers
Atlas F.C. managers
Deportivo Toluca F.C. managers
Boca Juniors managers
Club Atlético Vélez Sarsfield managers
C.F. Monterrey managers
Querétaro F.C. managers
Chiapas F.C. managers
Mexico national football team managers
Costa Rica national football team managers
CONCACAF Gold Cup-winning managers
2004 Copa América managers
2005 FIFA Confederations Cup managers
2006 FIFA World Cup managers
2011 CONCACAF Gold Cup managers
2011 Copa América managers
Argentine emigrants to Mexico
Argentine expatriate sportspeople in Mexico
Argentine Primera División players
Liga MX players
Expatriate football managers in Mexico
Liga MX managers
Pyramids FC managers